= Gene Effect =

2012 video game

- Developer(s): Lighstorm 3D
- Platform(s): iOS; Android
- Release: iOS: WW: May 2012; Android: WW: January 2013

Gene Effect is an action video game developed by German studio Lightstorm 3D and released for iOS on May 2, 2012 and for Android on January 12, 2013.

== Gameplay ==
Using the mining ship Triton, players navigate an alien planet in search of a lost ship.

== Reception ==
Gene Effect received mixed to positive reviews from critics upon release. On Metacritic, the game holds a score of 78/100 based on 5 reviews.
